Your Memory and Me (Spanish: Tu recuerdo y yo) is a 1953 Mexican comedy drama film directed by Miguel M. Delgado.

Cast
 Rosita Arenas
 Lupe Carriles 
 Agustín Isunza 
 Raúl Martínez 
 Diana Ochoa 
 Chula Prieto 
 Carlota Solares 
 Domingo Soler 
 Fernando Soto 
 Pedro Vargas

References

Bibliography 
 María Luisa Amador. Cartelera cinematográfica, 1950-1959. UNAM, 1985.

External links 
 

1953 films
1953 comedy-drama films
Mexican comedy-drama films
1950s Spanish-language films
Films directed by Miguel M. Delgado
Mexican black-and-white films
1950s Mexican films